The 2021–22 season was the 120th season of competitive association football in Spain.

National team

Spain national football team

Friendlies

2022 FIFA World Cup qualification

Group B

UEFA Euro 2020

Knockout phase

2021 UEFA Nations League Finals

Final

UEFA Nations League

Group 2

Spain national under-23 football team

Friendlies

Summer Olympics 

Due to the COVID-19 pandemic, the games have been postponed to the summer of 2021. However, their official name remains 2020 Summer Olympics with the rescheduled 2021 dates have yet to be announced.

Group C

Knockout stage

Final

Spain women's national football team

Friendlies

2023 FIFA Women's World Cup qualification

Group B

2022 Arnold Clark Cup

UEFA competitions

UEFA Super Cup

UEFA Champions League

Group stage

Group B

Group D

Group E

Group F

Group G

Knockout phase

Round of 16

|}

Quarter-finals

|}

Semi-finals

|}

Final

UEFA Europa League

Group stage

Group B

Group G

Knockout stage

Knockout round play-offs

|}

Round of 16

|}

Quarter-finals

|}

UEFA Youth League

UEFA Champions League Path

Group B

Group D

Group E

Group F

Group G

Domestic Champions Path

First round

|}

Second round

|}

Play-offs

Knockout round play-offs

|}

Round of 16

|}

Quarter-finals

|}

Semi-finals

|}

UEFA Women's Champions League

Qualifying rounds

Round 1

Semi-finals

|}

Final

|}

Round 2

|}

Group stage

Group B

Group C

Knockout phase

Quarter-finals

|}

Semi-finals

|}

Final

Men's football

League season

La Liga

Segunda División

Cup competitions

2021–22 Copa del Rey

Final

Supercopa de España

Final

Copa Federación de España

Women's football

League season

Primera División

Segunda División

Cup competitions

Copa de la Reina

Final

Supercopa de España

Final

References

Notes

 
Football
Football
Spain
Spain